Winteringham Haven railway station was a port facility on the south bank of the Humber Estuary, Lincolnshire, England. It was constructed by the North Lindsey Light Railway at the end of a  mile branch line from Winteringham. The railway company provided two chutes to load ships, one for coal the other for slag, a by-product of the iron and steel making process. It was opened on 15 July 1907.

Route

Notes

References

External links
Winteringham Haven station on navigable 1947 O.S. map

Disused railway stations in the Borough of North Lincolnshire
Former Great Central Railway stations
Railway stations in Great Britain opened in 1907